Carolina Alves da Silva João (born 1 March 1997) is a Portuguese sailor. She competed in the Laser Radial event at the 2020 Summer Olympics.

References

External links
 
 

1997 births
Living people
Sportspeople from Lisbon
Portuguese female sailors (sport)
Olympic sailors of Portugal
Sailors at the 2020 Summer Olympics – Laser Radial